Kites are tethered flying objects which fly by using aerodynamic lift, requiring wind (or towing) for generation of airflow over the lifting surfaces.

Various types of kites exist, depending on features such as material, shape, use, or operating skills,Wind required. Kites may fly in air, water, or other fluids such as gas and other liquid gaining lift through deflection of the supporting medium. Variations in design of tethering systems and lifting surfaces are regularly introduced, with lifting surfaces varying in stiffness from limp sheet material to fully solid material.

Manufacture
Kites may be built by the flier or by a dedicated kite manufacturer, which may be a member of the
Kite Trade Association International (KTAI), which also includes kite retailers.

Materials
Kites have been made from the following materials:

Plastic – for example, a Styrofoam-only kite
Organic materials – such as plant leaves and grass
Paper
Textiles such as rip-stop nylon, nylon, or Dacron

Wing character
Monoplane
Flexible sail
Stiffened flexible sail
Rigid wing
Biplane
Multiplane
Low-aspect-ratio – wings that have a narrow chord (length from front edge to rear edge), compared with their span
High-aspect-ratio – wings that have a wide chord, compared with their span
Ram-air inflated
Closed bladder, gas-inflated
Rotating wing – also known as rotor kite or gyroglider (e.g. Focke Achgelis Fa 330)

Multiple unit kites
A multiple unit kite may be made of a single wing, several wings, or several sub-kite units arranged as trains, chains, coterie, single-branching, multiple-branching, arch-kite, "ladder" mill dynamic kite-chain, or combinations of these patterns. World records for the number of kites in a kite train are in the literature; teams of people are used to fly kites of high-count sub-kite units. Parafoil stacks have been built with over 200 kite units.
Multiple pilots
Large kite systems may require more than one pilot. In a team like the "Flying Squad" of nine kite pilots each person might fly his own sub-kite while, as a team, its kites form a unified display. One pilot may simultaneously fly several kites; the pilot with several kites forms one kite system of two, three or more kites in the system.

Buoyancy

Kites are normally heavier than their supporting medium, such as a kite flown in air. Some kites have their lift augmented by lighter than air gases, allowing the kite to remain airborne without wind or being towed.

Hydro dynamic kites can have positive, neutral or negative buoyancy, relying on hydrodynamic lift to manoeuvre, rise, or dive.

Control
Kites can be controlled by various methods which usually involve manipulation of the tether/control lines, lifting gas density control and in some cases by aero-dynamic control surfaces.

Stability
Kites can have positive, neutral or negative stability, in all axes of control, in the same fashion as aircraft. Kites with positive stability tend to return to a stable state automatically, whereas those with neutral or negative stability require control inputs to return the kite to the required position or attitude.

Legality

Kite flying has been enjoyed for thousands of years in South Asia and the Indian subcontinent. The goal is to cut off the rival kite (usually flown by someone on a neighbouring rooftop). In order to cut the "enemy's" kite line, a very strong fishing line, prepared with glue and powdered glass covers some length of the kite line or wire. The kites themselves are usually of a standard size and shape (square shape) and mostly made from paper and split bamboo. After a kite is cut down, it has to be recovered by the cutting party. The last flying kite wins the game. The government of Pakistan has repeatedly outlawed this sport. It claimed that some people had been decapitated by driving with their scooters or motorbikes across abandoned glass powder & glue prepared kite wire. Others have fallen off roofs while engaging in kite flying. Other reasons that were given was that the mass sport and its associated festivals of Basant are considered "unislamic" and connected to Hinduism. Kite flying was also banned in Afghanistan during the reign of the Taliban. However, large sections of society simply ignore the ban. Since there was outrage over the ban, the government of Punjab has lifted the ban, however a ban on powdered glass wire has been imposed, as well as the thickness of the wire itself.

Glossary of kite types

A
Advertising kites These kites hold advertisements, logos of organizations, slogans for causes. Orders of mass-produced kites imprinted with an advertisement form a significant part of kite commerce.
Aerial photography platform kites
Airplane kites Large kite planes are finding an application in renewable energy generation.
Arc Kitedesigned by Peter Lynn
Arch kite/multiple-kite arch in this design, one or more lines holds many kites in an arch: a rotary two-anchor rainbow arch and/or a static two-anchor rainbow arch. If the kites making up the arch kite rotate using the Magnus effect the term also applied is rainbow kite or just bow kite or kite bow or "sky bow" or SkyBow; one form of the rotating arch or rainbow kite is the ribbon kite (in one or multiple segments). Swivels in the line are important. Distinguish between a long arching collection of kites in a bow, or a rainbow pattern from a power kite called a bow kite.

Aqua-gliderThese various-formed manned kites were kited behind tow boats over water. Air Force Lt. Col. Bill Skliar in 1959 designed a biplane kite glider nicknamed Bayou Bird. In 1961, Tom H. Purcell designed and flew an aluminum-framed Fleep-like Rogallo hang glider kite over land; in 1962, he kited the same wing (but pontooned) while over water. His effort was imaged and noted in Skysurfer Magazine in its May/June issue of 1973, published by EAA inductee Michael Markowski, author of Hang Glider's Bible. The 1962 Mike Burns SkiPlane and 1963 Dickenson wings closely matched the Purcell, Barry Hill Palmer, and the Charles Richard NASA Paresev 1B wing; minor control sticks derived from the triangle control frame were used in each of these kites (which sometimes glided).  These kites, towed high, could stop their kiting and release into a glide. See section "B" for boats that have a major operating sector as a kite (for example, a 1930 Peel Glider Boat).

Archimedes screw kite These kinetic rotary kites mimic the Archimedean screw.
Arch kites a single kite with an arch form, multiple arches, or an arch top

Art kites Video kites, kites on photographs, fine-art illustrations containing kite images, paintings, sculptures, flight-simulator images of kites, engineering drawings, sewing plans, drawings of kite plans, story illustrations in children's books, patent drawings. A Genevieve Lytton graphic card illustrated a fancy-dress-ball costume involving a hexagon kite with tail and string reel.

Asymmetrical kites Good kite design and construction practice includes the aim of having the left and right sides of the kite's wing be mirror images of each other, for balance. A collection of builders are exploring asymmetrical designs, which involve special challenges.
Autogyro kites (gyro kite, heli-kite, helicopter kite) use unpowered autorotation

B

Bag kites Made from single or multiple bags. Some use paper bags, others plastic. Bags simply as a source of material is a trivial use; other bag kites retain much of the form of the bag.
Balloon kites Applies to both lighter- and heavier-than-air kite types. The lighter-than-air balloon kite is the kytoon, which is aloft whether or not the wind blows. When the kytoon is not kiting, it floats aloft as a pure balloon; when it is kiting, it is a true kite. Kytoons are used to loft radio antennas, rescue signals, and kite-line laundry.
Balloon kite with "ballooning" spiderlings Not a mechanical balloon, but a collection of spider-silk threads used for dispersal of spiders. Richard Miller, in his 1967 book Without Visible Means of Support, described the mechanics of the double-kite system where the upper kite lifts and drags, coupled with the lower kite that lifts downwards and drags; the common kiteline results in a kiting system in free flight. In the chapter, "Flying Kites", he writes that in the nineteenth century Hiram Stevens Maxim observed the kiting of spiders; biologists continue to use the misleading term, "ballooning". Bug-hunter Darrell Ubick correctly recognized that ballooning spiders actually are kiting, as noted by Pamela S. Turner in "Super-Powered Spiders". In Tales with Tails: Storytelling the Wonders of the Natural World, Kevin Strauss demonstrates in three places (pages 184, and 185 and 187) his understanding of the "kiting" of the "ballooning" spider (since no true balloon is ever made). Three staffers of the Straight Dope Science Advisory Board in Are Cobwebs Made By Spiders? recognized the kiting of ballooning spiders. A pest-control company has studied spiders and asserts it is kiting that is done by instars (spiderlings), even though the historical term is ballooning. The Rare Species Conservatory affirms that ballooning spiders actually do not balloon, but kite.
Barish sailwing
Barn Door Kites
Barn door kites are very similar to an eddy kite except that barndoor have two vertical diagonal spars in contrast to the diamond's single vertical spar.
Beginner kites
 Kites of this type are separated by sellers, makers, and leaders.
Bell kites Developed by Alexander Graham Bell
Bermuda kiteTraditional Bermudian kites flown at Easter; world-record holders for altitude and flight duration
Biplane kites
Bird kites Abstract or realistic-looking bird kites, dynamic bird kites, bird art on kite faces
Boat kites A 1930 Peel Glider Boat was kited on a 1000-foot line, and would get about three miles of air-gliding distance after releasing its kite line. Many contemporary inflated boats being kited begin and end their kited session as towed boats.
Bowed kite This term has several meanings: a class of parafoil kite, an early British bowing-top-edge-sparred kite, and the rotating-ribbon rainbow-like two-anchor one-line arch kite. Distinguished from Sky Bow or rotating-ribbon kites and arch-bow stick kites

Box kite
Box Delta kites
Butterfly kites This type occurs at several levels: art, applique, and realistic motion.

C
C-kites
Cambodian kites The Kleng Ek kite, a Cambodian musical kite, is often flown at night; there is also a Cambodian pocket kite. Bamboo is very common for Cambodian kites. To recapture the early Cambodian kites, a book (Khmer Kites) has been published.
Candle kites
Cantonese kites
Cayley kite reproductions of Sir George Cayleys kites
Cellular kites
Chapi-chapiA type of kite popular in the Philippines, usually constructed from old broomsticks and newspapers.

Cheap kites Available in several sectors: the home builder aiming to build kites from handy materials (even trash), and the commercial sector that aims to have some kites at low prices to attract customers
Chemiluminescence kites
Chinese kites From Beijing, Weifang, Tianjing, Nantong, Jiangnan and Taiwan.
Circle kites Circular kites, circle disk kites, disk kites, EPS-plate kites (see "Cup kites" below), paper-plate kites
Cody kites War kites designed by Samuel Franklin Cody (1867–1913)
Conyne kites
Cooperative kites are kites made by more than one person with significant contributions by each person in the cooperation effort.
Cube kites(one or more)
Cup kites Kites made mostly of cups, often paper or expanded polystyrene (EPS)
Cursor kites Internet-age cursor images flown give a contemporary look to the sky.

D
Davies kites Single diamond colourful kites favoured in the UK
Della porta kites This is a single-line kite which is usually square or a rectangle which contains two spars diagonally crossed. 
Delta or Delta-wing kites Single-line, dual-line stunt kites; deltas with a triangular box are a variant
Diamond kites (see "Eddy kites" below) Diamond types appear from mini to very large, and from low-cost beginner utility to high-quality, state-of-the-art target-control diamonds.
Display kites A class of kites "for display" has come into being for festivals, shows, library exhibitions, museum exhibitions and other events.
Disposable kites In kite fishing, disposable kites are used. In Philippine kite fighting, the object is to destroy the opponent's kite body directly.
Duryea kite reproductions(Charles Duryea)
Dopero or Double Pearson Roller Kites

Double-kite systems
 Two coupled kites, but confined; or two coupled kites in free flight in the same (air-only or water-only, for example) or different media (air and water, for example). An example is kite-surfing with a board as a hybrid water kite, coupled with a power air kite. Without Visible Means of Support by Richard Miller (1967) details two coupled air kites, with the upper kite in the jet stream and the lower kite below the jet stream. Two (or more) kites, kite-lined to one anchor, one mooring or one kite operator, are included here. Two kites (or more) communicating with each other for a purpose are coupled.
Dragon kites Two categories: those mimicking the figure of a dragon in a decoration or figure kite, and those of a series of kites in a train or stack.

E
Eddy kite or diamond kites
Edo kites Rectangular traditional Tokyo kite. (Edo was an old name for Tokyo.)
Electricity-generating kites There are hydro kites and air kites specifically designed to generate electricity as their dominant purpose. Also, there are kites that have electricity generation as a secondary arrangement.
Exotic kitesdo not fit other categories.

F
Fast kitesTwo definitions: a) kites that move fast (high-speed kites), and b) kites that can be made from scratch in a fast or quick manner (see "Q" for Quick kites). Some fighter and sport kites are built so that they can move very fast under control. Speed records are reported. Kite surfers appreciate power kites with high speed. Kites in other media like water, soil, or plasma have speeds specific to their conditions. Speed is relative to the activity and purpose. Kite-fishing requires speed.

Feather kites
Fighter kite
Figure kites(mimic shape and appearance of animals, insects, people, objects, products)

First kitesThe first of a type. Invention kite.
Fishing kites Some believe that there is no better way to present bait to fish than with a fishing kite
Flat kites
Flexible-wing kiteswith variable amounts of stiffening by spars and rigid parts
Flexikitesand its reproductions
Flexifoil(original and then company kites different from original).
Foilor parafoil kite
Funny kites These kites evoke laughter.

G
Gallaudet kites Gallaudet Hydrokites:<Yale professor was told not to experiment with aeronautics. However his biplane kite with tail involved wing warping prior to the Wright brothers use of such control means. Edson Gallaudet formed the Gallaudet Engineering company with his brother and then Gallaudet Aircraft Company (GAC), earliest precursor to the company General Dynamics. The Gallaudet Hydrokite was the beginning of a seaplane interest of the GAC.
Garbasail
Geometric kite
Genki kite
Giant kites
Gibson Girl was a type of cellular kite for radio antenna raising from rescue raft.
Glider kites Manned and unmanned aircraft intended primarily for gliding are frequently tested and flown as kites under tow from ground or water vehicles or animals, machines, or other people. Some glider kites released to free-flight gliding may or may not be free-flight kites, depending on how payload may (or may not) be tugging the glider's wing through a tow line set. Primary manned gliders, kited, are glider kites when being kited; when released to glide, these are not kites. Conversely, the hang-lined hang glider pilot may be kited up in his or her aircraft but when released to free-flight, such aircraft remains a gliding kite or kite glider. The Martin Glider was kited by many different means.
Gyrocopter or helicopter kites(see autogyro)

H
Hang glider Usually manned. Many hang gliders are true kites; hang gliders that are not true kites are not covered here. Ed Grauel includes hang gliders in his typing of kites.
Hang glider kites that are unmanned Unmanned kites as mimics of manned hang gliders (kites or not).
Hargrave kites(Lawrence Hargrave)

Helikites A aerodynamically sound kite-balloon combination filled with helium. Designed and patented in the UK and USA by Sandy Allsopp in 1993, the Helikite is a true kite, yet lighter-than air for staying aloft when kiting is insufficient for flight. Helikites can cope with a very large wind range from 0 to 60 mph, possibly the largest wind range of any kite. So they are useful where there is an absolute need for flight such as professional uses. Helikites are used for photography, scientific atmospheric monitoring, military surveillance, radio-relay, surveying, oceanic uses, bird control and antenna-lifting.
Hexagonal kites US 51860 patent was for a hexagonal kite by T. Perrins, granted 2 January 1866. A Birt kite may have preempted, in fact, the same kite. Ed Grauel opines that the Birt kite at the Kew Observatory preempted the Perrins kite; he noted that the same kite later became known as the barndoor or house kite. .
High aspect ratio kites Tow-launched hobby unmanned sailplanes are true kites during high-start kited launches; they may hold the record for single-line single-anchor high aspect ratio kites made by humans. However, the rotating ribbon single-line double-anchored Skybow kite (rotating ribbon arch kite of two anchors) that sits in the sky nearly as a rainbow is a kite with extreme aspect ratio. A different non-rotating ribbon kite by Anders Ansar follows the Barish sailwing concept to the extreme; Ansar suggests more than two anchor points. He also explains how two sailors holding a ribbon kite, e g on ice wearing ice skates, can sail straight upwind or straight down wind, the latter faster than the wind.
Historical kitesHistorical kites are builds that aim to match some historically important kite, sometimes to represent the first occurrence of a particular kite design. Patent kites are a subset of historical kites where the aim is to build a kite that materially illustrates a claim in a kite patent.
Hydro kites  Water kites – kites that fly in water or on the surface of water.

I
India kites
Indoor kites May be confused with zero-wind kites.
Inflatable single-line kites Distinguish between closed-bladder inflated kites (sausage balloon kite, other-form balloon kites) from open-bladder ram-air inflation (Jalbert parafoil and its derivatives) and the single-surface flexible-sail dynamic inflation (Rogallo and Barish wings). A kite can have two or three types of inflation parts (Jalbert's 1944 patent claimed a kite that had the closed-cell inflation as well as a sailwing part). Over-water flying applications have invited air kites having light-than-water flotation capability; power-kiting for kitesurfing with leading-edge-inflated (LEI) bladder held inside textile pocket is one such use. Another is in fishing kites

Invisible kites(radar-invisible, very-low-visibility translucents, out-of-sights, non-lighted night kites, imagined kites, kites flown by the blind as they feel the line tension change)

J
Jalbert parafoil kitesafter inventions of Domina Jalbert
Japanese kites

Java kites (pre-Malay kite, pre-Eddy kite)
Jesus kites This type of kite is found in both art and flying kites.  Aquilone di Gesù kites use art on standard kite forms or specialized figure kites. In the Philippines, noted kitemaker Eulogio Catahan is a leader in Jesus kites.

K
Kid kitesThis type of kite is fit for young kids. Both hobby authors and commercial suppliers note this type of kite.

Killer kites Three types of killer kites are recognized in kiting. One type of killer kite has the task of taking out of flight another kite; such is in sport and also in practical kite energy operations to take out a kite that is fugitive.  Another killer kite regards the notorious kites that cause death and injury; some nations' kite festivals have been marred or cancelled because of killer kites; governments have gotten involved to halt or slow the effect of killer kites. The kite's glassed lines or the kite's metallic base material have resulted in far too many deaths and injuries. Death by kites is part of the reason the world knows this kite type. Another type of "killer kite" are those that simply deeply astound viewers and users with some unique exciting quality.

Kirby kites(also known as a bird kite – a variant of the Malay kite) (not to be confused with the manned glider called the Kirby Kite, which was a kite launched into a gliding or soaring session) (also not to be confused with the radio-controlled Airworld Kirby Kite scale glider, which has a kite life when being given a kited launch)
KiteSail by Maurice Grenier
KiteShip by Dave Culp.
Korean kites
KytoonA shaped balloon that kites (two general types: 1) lighter-than-medium, in which it moves within a gravity field 2) heavier-than-air kytoon, or heavier than the medium in which it flies. Density is implied when saying "heavier"-than-the-ambient medium). For air, some kytoons are less dense than air (using hydrogen, helium, heated air); other kytoons filled with, for example, unheated air are not buoyant in still air but are still kited. Includes barrage kites of the kytoon type that Domina Jalbert designed for defense purposes and peacetime antenna-lifting by ham-radio operators. Car dealers raise advertisements with kytoons (see Observation balloon. The kytoon is a true kite in flight in an appropriate moving stream of material, fluid, gas, or air; it is also a true balloon

L 
LaddermillA complex of sub-kites in a loop line with various uses, one of which is the generation of electricity; invented by Dr. Ockels of Delft University.
Landboarding kitesKite landboarding uses traction and power kites.
Lang kites
Langley kitesSee Samuel Langley
Leaf kites(traditional, decorative artistic mimic, fishing leaf or novel)
LEI kitesLeading-edge-inflated kite 
Lighter-than-air kites
Light-emitting kites Chemiluminescence kites, electrically lighted kites (battery and also real-time in-kite generated electricity for the lights, light-reflection kites
Low aspect ratio kites Spider gossamer kites made of spider silk are low-aspect-ratio kites made by a spider. Man-made long sausage-balloon kites are low-aspect-ratio kites.

M
Machijirushi kitesfine paper and bamboo from Hamamatsu continue, after centuries of use in celebration and town kite-fighting.
Magnus effect kitesrotate span-wise.
Malay kites (pre-Eddy kite)
Manned Man-lifting kites
Maori kites
Miniature kites Over 800 miniature kites were on display in 1999 at the Muncie Convention Center in Muncie, Indiana, USA for the world's largest such event; it was called the AKA Miniature Kite Art Gallery. Also known as tiny kites, small kites, or little kites.

Musical kites The Cambodian Ek (Khlèng-Phnorng or Khlèn-Èk) musical kite is an enduring part of the rural Cambodian culture.

N
Night kites
Novelty kites Novelty kites bring vitality to kite-building and flying. Festivals frequently have an award category for novelty kites.

O
Octagonal kitesFour-stick octagonal kites exist; collapsible eight-stick kites that pop up like a common umbrella have been registered in patents. A fine-art example of an eight-sided regular octagonal kite is illustrated. Stop-sign and octagonal box kites are other examples.
Octopus kitesFigure mimic of octopus

P

Parachute kites(see paraglider below) Parachutes that have a directional venting small (parasail, directional parachutes) or massive (Jalbert parafoil, Rogallo parawing) are kites moored to free-falling body or payload. Symmetrical, non-directional zero-lift/drag ratio parachutes are streamers and not kites; no net deflection from the stream occurs in a true parachute.
Parafoil
Parafoil stunt kites

Paraglidermanned (these are kites both in free-fall, and kited either by the pilot or secondarily by a towing or moored device or powered harness system).

ParasailParachutes modified to have a positive lift/drag ratio, so the wing can be kited to carry humans or other payload
ParavaneWater kite
Patent kites Kites that have been represented in ornamental design patents throughout history are sometimes built to demonstrate kite history. Also, mechanical kite patents hold claims that form the focus of some kite builders' project focus. Sellers enjoy some protection when a sold kite is a patent kite. One of the most noteworthy of the patent kites is that of George Pocock.
Pentagonal kites also known as penta- or five-sided polygonal kite. The five points give ample opportunity for a head, two hands and two legs. Distinguish pentagonal kites from five-point star kites that are ten-sided (unless art is simply showing the five-point star). Five recalls the shapes of humans and animals.
Picnic plate kitesSee Plate kites, below.
Plasma kites Distinguish ambient flying media: blood plasma, space plasma or confined scientific-laboratory or industrial plasma streams. Plasma is the most common phase of matter in the universe.
Plate kites paper, plastic or EPS foam picnic-plate kites. This type of kite includes figure, artistic, dragon, and rotary kites. The most simple kite is the single plate, uncut and left as a circular kite; complexity is up to its maker.
Powered-harness hang glider kites

Powered paragliders(Powered paragliding)

Q
Quantum kites
Quick or Fast kitesQuick kites are kites that can be made quickly; simplicity may or may not be characteristic of a quick kite. Commonly available materials are used by quick-kite designers. Specially ordered materials are not used, and few (if any) tools are needed.

R
Race kitesKites specially designed for high-speed traction racing (on land, water, ice, snow).

Radio-controlled kiteunpowered Both for sport and commercial purposes, the complexity of more than one line emphasizes control of power, position and attack angle. One line simplifies reeling and line control. A project in the power-kite sport field is the Slarc. Radio-control de-powering and release systems are being developed. Instead of the drag of two, three, four, or five lines, the single-line radio-controlled kite has the drag of just one line.
Radio-controlled kitepowered scale and manned Distinguish a product that is not a kite (called RC Kite) from true kites that have radio controls on a kite-lined kite wing.
Ram-air kitesSled kites with ram-air cavities and Jalbert parafoil power kites are ram-air kites. The wind rams into the cavities and inflates sections of a kite to give the kite shape and sturdiness.
Recycled kites  Kites made from recycled goods
Revolution kite or Rev kites(four-line revolution stunt kites by Joe Hadzicki)
Ribbon kites<Several kinds: large non-rotating ribbon arch kite (windbow), rotating ribbon kite, and kite with main sails made up of grids and meshes of ribbons (latticework kites). German kite designer Willi Koch specialized in mesh or ribbon-set kites.
Rigid kites(no flexible sail part)
Rogallo Corner kites First intended use: radar reflector for rescue
Rogallo Parawing kite
Roller kite.'Rolloplan kites (German origin)

Rotary kitesVertical axis rotary, spanwise rotary, mixed rotary, streamwise axially rotary.Classic Rotor (Meat Tray) Retrieved 16 March 2011. EPS, Styrofoam, and balsa special Magnus-effect rotary kites can be made with several construction methods for two-line control kites for heavier breezes.Modern UFO Rotor Kites Retrieved 16 March 2011. Many spanwise rotary kites are two-line control kites. However, UFO-SAM is a single-line rotary Magnus-effect kite; one of the leading makers of the kite has died, but a manufacturer has continued offering the kite.Kenneth Sams Retrieved 16 March 2011. A two-line rotary kite using a special control bar is instructed in the patent by J. R. Carnwath filed on 29 March 1948. Kites that revolve but do not obtain lift from the revolving motion are distinct from Magnus-effect lifters or gyrocopting lifting rotating kites; Thomas Ansboro of Scotland, in 1891, instructed in a US patent 464412 about a revolving hexagonal kite where the bridling is critical.
A ringed UFO rotary kite patent indicated a special bridling ring and a central rotating ring (US Patent 4779825). The very high aspect ratio rotating spanwise ribbon kites (Skybows) are continuing to gain interest; these require at least two swivels. Also, a variety of rotary kites that are nearly streamers rotate almost windward; some are vaned and some are not.US patent:3086738 "Rotating kite", Lubash, John J., 1963, April Retrieved 16 March 2011. In 1995 Carl E. Knight and Jo Ann F. Knight instructed a rotary kite that rotates near windward for its axis (not like autogyro or spanwise magnus).
Rokkaku or Rokaku kitesRokaku kites Retrieved 16 March 2011.
Rotating Ribbon kites One version is called Skybow. The long ribbon is at least a two-anchored system with at least two swivels, but may be segmented to allow segments of ribbon to rotate at different speeds. Autorotation, giving lift via the Magnus effect, allows a rainbow arch kite to fly. A human operator at one end, with a fixed ground anchor at the other, is one example; a separate human operator at each of two anchors is another. More than two tethers can be used.

S
Sauls' Barrage kitesU.S. Design Patent No. D136,018 COLLAPSIBLE KITE Hosea C. Sauls Retrieved 16 March 2011.

Sail kites Sails that are fully tethered and give a net positive lift are sail kites. Sailing vessels on water and land use sail kites. The kiting tethers can be short or long. Power kites are frequently sail kites as a power kite is used to sail a skier, landsailing buggy, wakeboarder, ground wheeled vehicle, boats and so on.

Self-erecting collapsible kitesCollapsible kites that self-erect upon a triggering event to full kite form have special niche uses and appeal. Positive-inflated kytoons would be typed here, if a triggering erected the kytoon. Already-erected kites like the parafoil are self-inflating, but not usually considered as needing erecting (since they are already softly finished in form, except for placing them in the wind).Inflatable kite arrangement and launcher Vernon G. Pascoe et al. Retrieved 16 March 2011.
Show kites See "Display kites".  Show kites are one category of display kite.
Skating kitesSee Kite skating
Sled kitesinclude the Buda Jewish Kite of 1904, the Scott and Allison Sleds and many variations.Hooded Kite Retrieved 16 March 2011.Make A Sled Kite Retrieved 16 March 2011.
Signature kitesKites made by a particular person become prized possessions for some people.
Single-piece kites
Sode or Sode Dako kitesThis type wins attention with its shape, especially in Japan.
Soft kitesParawing, parafoil, some un-sticked sleds, Barish sailwing, Playsail, KiteShip, foils
Solar kitesin plasma or photonic media; Solar-kite engineers and scientists are expanding the definition of a kite. The sail may be full of solar-energy electricity-generating material. Another example is the Solar Max Delta Kite.
Soil kites
Sound-making kites
Square kites
Stacked kitesStacking sub-kite units
Stunt kites
Styrofoam kitesWhen Styrofoam dining plates are used in a dragon-kite segment, when a kite is made from styrene drinking cups, or when kites are made with the dominant material styrofoam or EPS foam, then the kite world refers to the kite type as a styrofoam kite. This allows use of recycled materials.Sparless Styrofoam Kites 

T

Target kitesAs designed by Paul Garber, a key gunnery practice target in war.Paul E. Garber Target Kite Retrieved 16 March 2011. Francis Melvin Rogallo, inventor of a fully flexible kite in 1948, also filed a patent on 23 January 1963 for a target kite that used stiffenings, which was also a corner reflector.

Tetrahedral kitesInventor Alexander Graham Bell focused on these types of kites; This kite type was a dominant interest of Mr. Bell's.
Thai kites

Toy kites
Traction kitesfor relaunching from water, differ from dedicated land traction kites
Train or Kite trainConnect many kite-body units onto one line in various ways and have a kite that is a kite train, or train of kites.  Dragon kites, centipede kites, and some arches are trains. A train of mini kites is a mini-kite train.FANO 1997, Kitetrains Retrieved 16 March 2011.
Trainer kitesKites of lower power that are used to practice maneuvers before higher-powered kites are used.
Tukkal or Tukal kitesSpecial four-stick kite

U
Underwater kite Water kites have an analogous presence in other liquids as the flying media; kite expert David Culp published about non-water media for kiting within those fluids rather than air (see "Water kites" below).  An early presentation of an underwater box kite was repeated in the Drachen Foundation Kite Journal from a 1909 Scientific American article.

V
Ventilated kitesFlying kites in high or stormy winds is achieved in several ways; one way is to have high-porosity or ventilated kites Effective sail area is reduced, while shape and appearance can follow known kite shapes of non-ventilated kites.
Victory kites One series of noted kites: the Victory kites of Stormy Weathers (yes that is his name) include Star Victory, Swift Victory, and Winged Victory.  Mr. Weathers was respected for building kites from common materials.

W
Waffle kitessuch as those made by Joseph LeCornu
Water kites Filed 3 February 1883 This mechanism handles a water kite or underwater inverted kite; also spelled paravane, paravanes. Underwater kiting of heavier-than-water (even ballasted) instruments serve industry and science. Domina Jalbert told Tal Streeter that water kites are hardly different from air kites and could have many applications.Kenneth D. Anderson  Water kite and method of using the same
Water relaunchable kitesAir kites that can be launched and relaunched once the kite's wing and lines are settled on or in the water.
Woglum kites(variant of the Malay kite). Gilbert T. Woglum in 1896 flew a train of kites over a parade and hung a golden flag from the main line.
Work kites or working kites: are kites designed to perform specialized tasks or produce work or energy. George Pocock put kites to work pulling vessels. Kiteboarding puts kites to work. Especially in crosswind kite power there are work kites able to gain high energy from apparent winds created by flying the wings to crosswind.

X
X-treme kitesExtreme sport kites.
X flat two-stick kites the frame is "X" format with two spars; rectangular or square or cut to form X. Flat kites made of two sticks. Artistic alphabet character "X" kite.

Y
Yacht kitesLeslie Hunt's book, 25 Kites'', includes a yacht-kite plan.
Youth kitesKites for the very young. Also beginner kites, kid kites, kiddie kites. Kites suitable for the very young are almost always small single-line kites using cotton kite line. Festivals sometimes have a category called "youth kites".

Z
Zero-wind kitesKite pilot stays within a tight ground circle, or pumps the kite line without moving, or walks or runs when there are zero-wind conditions (also known as nil-wind, null-wind, no-wind, indoor kites). The Ninja zero- and low-wind kite plan is open for all for non-commercial use.

See also
 Ballooning (spider) (mechanical kiting by spiderlings)
 Controlled aerodynamic instability phenomena
 Domina Jalbert
 Francis Rogallo
 Kite applications
 Kite control systems
 Kite mooring
 Kite rig
 List of surface water sports
 Paravane (water kite)
 Paravane (weapon)
 Spider silk

References

External links
 Best Breezes: Kite History, Kite Blog and Time Lines of Kite History
 A QUANTITATIVE STUDY OF KITE PERFORMANCE IN NATURAL WIND WITH APPLICATION TO KITE ANEMOMETRY
 Builder Plans
 Nano Sail-D. Inflated frame space kite
 Unique Kite Design Collection

Kites
Articles containing video clips